Penicillium brasilianum is a fungus species of the genus of Penicillium. Penicillium brasilianum produces the compounds isoroquefortine C, griseofulvin, ergosterol peroxide, 3β-hydroxy-(22E,24R)-ergosta-5,8,22-trien-7-one, cerevisterol, (22E,24R)-6β-methoxyergosta-7,22-diene-3β,5α-diol.

See also
List of Penicillium species

Further reading

References

brasilianum